Javier Martínez Tabernero (born 10 May 1997) is a Spanish retired footballer who last played for Real Unión as a forward.

Club career
Born in Pamplona, Navarre, Martínez joined CA Osasuna's youth setup in 2012, after starting out at CD Peñas Oscenses. He made his debuts as a senior with the reserves in the 2014–15 campaign, in the Tercera División.

On 17 October 2015 Martínez made his professional debut, coming on as a late substitute for Nino in a 1–0 home win against Albacete Balompié in the Segunda División. He played one further match for the main squad before leaving the club, and subsequently resumed his career in the lower leagues, representing CD Izarra and Real Unión.

References

External links

1997 births
Living people
Footballers from Pamplona
Spanish footballers
Association football forwards
Segunda División players
Segunda División B players
Tercera División players
CA Osasuna B players
CA Osasuna players
CD Izarra footballers
Real Unión footballers